A dredge-up is any one of several stages in the evolution of some stars. By definition, during a dredge-up, a convection zone extends all the way from the star's surface down to the layers of material that have undergone fusion. Consequently, the fusion products are mixed into the outer layers of the star's atmosphere, where they can be seen in stellar spectra.

Multiple stages

The first dredge-up The first dredge-up occurs when a main-sequence star enters the red-giant branch. As a result of the convective mixing, the outer atmosphere will display the spectral signature of hydrogen fusion: The C/C and C/N ratios are lowered, and the surface abundances of lithium and beryllium may be reduced.

The second dredge-up The second dredge-up occurs in stars with 4–8 solar masses. When helium fusion comes to an end at the core, convection mixes the products of the CNO cycle. This second dredge-up causes an increase in the surface abundance of He and N, whereas the amount of C and O decreases.

The third dredge-up The third dredge-up occurs after a star enters the asymptotic giant branch, after a flash occurs in a helium-burning shell. The third dredge-up brings helium, carbon, and the s-process products to the surface, increasing the abundance of carbon relative to oxygen; in some larger stars this is the process that turns the star into a carbon star.

Note: The names of the dredge-ups are set by the evolutionary and structural state of the star in which each occurs, not by the sequence in which they occur in any one star. Some lower-mass stars experience the first and third dredge-ups in their evolution without ever having gone through the second.

References

Stellar evolution